The fourth season of the animated television series Rick and Morty was confirmed by Adult Swim in May 2018. The season consists of 10 episodes. The first five episodes of the season aired from November 10, 2019 to December 15, 2019, while the remaining five aired from May 3, 2020 to May 31, 2020.

Cast and characters

Main cast
 Justin Roiland as Rick Sanchez and Morty Smith, the two main characters of the show; Rick is an eccentric mad scientist and Morty is his kind but easily distressed grandson
 Chris Parnell as Jerry Smith, Rick's son-in-law, and Morty's and Summer's father; a simple-minded and insecure person, who disapproves of Rick's influence over his family
 Spencer Grammer as Summer Smith, Rick's granddaughter, and Morty's sister; a conventional teenager who worries about improving her status among her peers
 Sarah Chalke as Beth Smith, Rick's daughter, and Morty's and Summer mother; a generally level-headed person, who is dissatisfied with her marriage

Guest cast
 Sherri Shepherd as the Judge, a judge who oversees Morty's trial
 Shepherd also voices Tony's wife
 Sam Neill as Monogatron Leader, the leader of the species who attempts to conquer Earth
 Kathleen Turner as Monogatron Queen, who loves podcasts and fights with her husband
 Taika Waititi as Glootie, Rick's intern and a member of the Monogatron species
 Jeffrey Wright as Tony, a kindhearted yet depressed alien salaryman who accidentally crosses Rick
 Pamela Adlon as Vermigurber's Child, whose life Rick threatens when attempting to track down Tony
 Adlon also voices Angie Flynt, a retired criminal
 Elon Musk as Elon Tusk, the CEO of Tuskla
 Justin Theroux as Miles Knightly, a master criminal and organiser of HeistCon
 Claudia Black as Ventriloquiver
 Matthew Broderick as Talking Cat, an alien cat who communicates through telepathy.
 Liam Cunningham as Balthromaw, a dragon who inadvertently soul bonds with Rick
 Keegan-Michael Key as Testicle Monster #1, a Time Cop from the fourth dimension
 Eddie Pepitone as Testicle Monster #2, a Time Cop from the fourth dimension
 Paul Giamatti as Story Lord, conductor of the Story Train
 Christopher Meloni as Jesus Christ, a personified version of Jesus Christ
 Susan Sarandon as Dr. Wong, a family therapist

Episodes

Production

Background and development

Following the conclusion of the third season in October 2017, the future of the show had remained in question, with no announcement of renewal or status of production. In March 2018, Harmon tweeted that he had not begun writing for a new season, in part because Adult Swim had not ordered any new episodes yet. Harmon explained that contract negotiations were more complicated than previous seasons.

Co-creators Dan Harmon and Justin Roiland wanted to have assurance that there would be many more seasons of Rick and Morty in the future, so that they would be able to focus on the show and minimize their involvement in other projects. Harmon had also stated that he wishes for future seasons to consist of more than ten episodes, saying: "Now I'm about to do season 4 of Rick and Morty and want to prove that I've grown." This was in reference to him admitting that he should work more efficiently, control his perfectionism, and avoid past mistakes that had resulted in the third season of the show comprising only ten episodes instead of fourteen, as was initially intended.

In May 2018, after prolonged contract negotiations, Adult Swim announced a long-term deal with the creators, ordering 70 new episodes over an unspecified number of seasons. The two co-creators expressed their satisfaction, with Roiland saying: "We're super excited that, for the first time ever, we're locked in, we know what the future is, we have job security." Harmon added: "Justin and I just needed enough episodes and the right kind of deal structure that would give us permission to do what we want to do, which is truly focus on the show. We got all that, and we’re both very excited."

One year later, at the WarnerMedia 2019 Upfronts presentation, the fourth season of Rick and Morty was announced to debut in November 2019, making the two-year gap between seasons three and four the longest in the history of the show. Although season four was said to contain only ten episodes, the creators have appeared confident that the 70-episode renewal deal will eventually reduce the waiting time between seasons, and it could possibly allow for bigger episode counts in the future. In October 2019, it was revealed that the first five episodes would begin airing on November 10, 2019. On April 1, 2020, it was announced that the remaining five episodes would begin airing on May 3, 2020.

Writing, recording and animation
Writing began in June 2018, with Roiland saying that—alongside maintaining product quality—this time around, the writers would have to work faster, so that the episodes get released quicker. Additionally, Harmon expressed his intention to let the show move forward by collaborating with the animators and making any necessary corrections along the way, instead of applying his perfectionistic tendencies in the earliest stages of writing.

In July 2018, Harmon and writer Mike McMahan posted images from the writers' room on social media, which showed "Story Circles" drawn on a blackboard. This eight-step storytelling formula developed by Harmon (a simplified version of Joseph Campbell's common narrative framework known as the hero's journey) was used in previous seasons to outline the narrative arc of an episode. It describes how the main character of the story leaves their comfort zone to pursue something they desire, how they are forced to adapt to an unfamiliar situation in order to achieve their goal, and how the story has changed them, as they return to their comfort zone. Emmy magazine, however, reported after an interview with Harmon that the writing team planned "to shake things up with a more anarchic writing style." This meant a rather deconstructive approach, where instead of focusing on story structure, attention would be given primarily to cultivating ideas, jokes, and pieces of dialogue, and then the stories would be built around those moments. Regarding the season's narrative arc, Roiland said that the season would contain "strong episodic episodes", and advised fans to watch them in the correct order.

In October 2018, series composer Ryan Elder told Inverse that he was expecting to get involved with the season, when the writing process would have been partially completed. The first guest voice was revealed in November 2018, when Sam Neill tweeted that he had enjoyed working with Rick and Morty, indicating that the team had finished writing some episodes. Later, Roiland would also announce Paul Giamatti, Taika Waititi and Kathleen Turner as guest stars in the fourth season.

In December 2018, Bardel Entertainment, Rick and Mortys Canadian animation studio, began hiring Toon Boom Harmony animators and FX artists to join the show's animation team. In January 2019, animation supervisor Eric Bofa Nfon posted a photo from a conference room on his Twitter account, that featured lead animator Etienne Aubry and line producer Mark Van Ee, indicating the start of the animation process for the season. Roiland said that when the episodes were returned from the studio "in color", the writers would look to make any necessary adjustments that might improve the episodes. Nevertheless, he appeared satisfied with the work that was done this season.

Reception
The fourth season has an approval rating of 94% on Rotten Tomatoes based on 34 reviews, with an average rating of 8.72/10. The site's critics consensus reads, "Rick and Morty fourth season is both an exciting progression and a delightful return to form that proves more than worth the two-year wait." Metacritic, which uses a weighted average, assigned the fourth season a score of 84 out of 100 based on 5 critics, indicating "universal acclaim."

Accolades

The episode "The Vat of Acid Episode" won an Emmy Award for "Outstanding Animated Program".

References

External links 

2019 American television seasons
2020 American television seasons
Rick and Morty seasons